Dayo Ojo (born October 10, 1994) is a professional Nigeria  footballer who is currently with Nigerian Premier League club Enyimba International F.C.

Career
Dayo Ojo began his professional league career with Rising Stars F.C. in 2008. In 2010, he was transferred to Sunshine Stars F.C., where he has been playing till 2016 December when his contract ended.

International career
Dayo Ojo was member of the Nigeria U-17 2010. He started his professional football career with Rising Stars F.C. in 2009 and got promotion into the senior team Sunshine Stars F.C. in 2010. He was part of 2010/11 Nigeria u17 national team and presently part of the Nigeria Super Eagles A international team. 
Dayo Ojo was a member of Sunshine Stars team that got to the Semi Finals of the CAF Confederations Cup in 2011 and the CAF Champions League in 2012.
Dayo Ojo is currently a member of the Nigeria Professional Football League All Star Team that is visiting Spain in August 2016 to feature in tournaments and friendlies against Valencia, Malaga and one other Spanish Side.

International goals
Scores and results list Nigeria's goal tally first.

References

External links
 https://web.archive.org/web/20160304042214/http://remisulola.com/dayo-ojo-will-play-continental-next-season-adeleye-gbenga/
 https://web.archive.org/web/20160304082630/http://mtnfootball.com//player/7287/Dayo-Ojo/140/Sunshine-Stars-/147/2012-CAF-Champions-League/ 
 FIFA.com

1994 births
Living people
Nigerian footballers
Rising Stars F.C. players
Sunshine Stars F.C. players
Nigeria Professional Football League players
Place of birth missing (living people)
Yoruba sportspeople
Association football forwards
Footballers from Enugu
Nigeria A' international footballers
2018 African Nations Championship players